Sagittaria graminea, the grassy arrowhead or grass-leaved arrowhead, is an aquatic plant species native to eastern North America.

Description
The seeds appear in a head about 1.5 cm wide.

Subspecies
A long list of varietal and subspecific names have been proposed over the years. Most have either been elevated to the species level or relegated to synonymy. As of April 2014, only two are recognized:

Sagittaria graminea subsp. graminea
Sagittaria graminea subsp. weatherbiana (Fernald) R.R.Haynes & Hellq.

Distribution and habitat
The species is known from every Canadian province from Ontario to Newfoundland, and every US state from the Great Plains to the Atlantic, plus Colorado, New Mexico and Cuba. It is considered naturalized in Washington state and in Vietnam. It grows in wet areas such as marshes and the banks of rivers and lakes.

References

External links

Missouri Botanical Garden, Plant Finder, Gardening Help, Sagittaria graminea
Plants for a Future
Lady Bird Johnson Wildflower Center, University of Texas
Center for Aquatic and Invasive Plants, University of Florida IFAS

graminea
Flora of Cuba
Flora of Eastern Canada
Flora of New Mexico
Flora of the Eastern United States
Flora of the United States
Flora without expected TNC conservation status
Freshwater plants
Plants described in 1803
Taxa named by André Michaux